Omari Spellman (born July 21, 1997) is an American professional basketball player for Anyang KGC of the Korean Basketball League (KBL). He played college basketball for the Villanova Wildcats, winning a national championship in 2018. Spellman was drafted 30th overall by the Atlanta Hawks in the 2018 NBA draft.

Early life and high school career

Spellman was born in Cleveland, Ohio. Spellman began 9th grade at Middletown High School in New York but transferred to Hoosac School after two to three months, but had to start in 8th grade there. Spellman later attended North Royalton High School in North Royalton, Ohio. As a sophomore, he averaged 22 points per game and 9.8 rebounds a game for the Bears. Before the start of his Junior year, Spellman decided to attend the MacDuffie School in Granby, Massachusetts. Spellman played his senior season at St. Thomas More in Montville, Connecticut. As a senior in 2015–16, he averaged 16 points and seven rebounds per game. Despite not being named a McDonald's All-American, Spellman was selected to play in the 2016 Jordan Brand Classic where He had a double-double of 12 points and 15 rebounds.

Spellman was rated as a five-star recruit and considered a top-15 player of the 2016 high school class. He was ranked the No. 16 overall player in the 2016 ESPN Top 100 and No. 5 among power forwards. He played AAU ball for the PSA Cardinals and wrote poetry as a downtime activity.

College career

Spellman was forced to redshirt his freshman year as a partial academic qualifier since he did not graduate with his original high school class. He broke down in tears when this was first announced but was more composed after the appeal process failed. In his redshirt year, he slimmed down from 300 lbs. to 245 lbs and focused on eating healthier. As a redshirt freshman, Spellman shot a team-high 44.6 percent from behind the arc. Spellman had a season-high 27 points in an 87–67 rout of Temple on December 13. He had 18-points, eight rebounds and three blocks in the Sweet 16 matchup against West Virginia. He averaged 10.9 points, 8.0 rebounds and 1.5 blocks per game on the national champion Villanova team. Following the season Spellman declared for the 2018 NBA draft, and announced he was staying in the draft on May 30.

Professional career

Atlanta Hawks (2018–2019)
On June 21, 2018, Spellman was selected by the Atlanta Hawks with the 30th overall pick in the 2018 NBA draft. He was the third of four Villanova players drafted that year, as well as the last of their first round selections there. Spellman signed with the Hawks on July 1, 2018.

On December 30, 2018, Spellman was assigned to the Hawks’ NBA G League affiliate, the Erie BayHawks. He made his G League debut the next night, scoring 28 points and collecting 14 rebounds in a loss.

Golden State Warriors (2019–2020)
On July 8, 2019, Spellman was traded to the Golden State Warriors for Damian Jones and a 2026 second-round pick.

Iowa Wolves (2020)
On February 6, 2020, Spellman was traded to the Minnesota Timberwolves, along with D'Angelo Russell and Jacob Evans, in exchange for Andrew Wiggins and a first round pick. After being traded, Spellman was assigned to the Timberwolves' G League affiliate, the Iowa Wolves. He recorded a triple-double with the Wolves on March 8, posting 18 points, 14 rebounds, and 12 assists in a 115–112 loss to the Santa Cruz Warriors. He did not play any games for the Timberwolves.

Erie BayHawks (2021) 
On November 24, 2020, Spellman was traded to the New York Knicks in exchange for Ed Davis. On January 7, 2021, he was waived by the Knicks.

On January 26, 2021, Spellman signed with the Erie BayHawks of the NBA G League.

Anyang KGC (2021–present)
Spellman joined the Chicago Bulls for the 2021 NBA Summer League.

On August 31, 2021, Spellman was reported to have signed with Anyang KGC.

Personal life
Spellman has a younger brother, Arashma Parks, who currently plays as a forward for Temple University, and a younger sister, Taiyier Parks, who currently plays basketball for Michigan State as a forward.

Career statistics

NBA

Regular season

|-
| style="text-align:left;"|
| style="text-align:left;"|Atlanta
| 46 || 11 || 17.5 || .402 || .344 || .711 || 4.2 || 1.0 || .6 || .5 || 5.9
|-
| style="text-align:left;"|
| style="text-align:left;"|Golden State
| 49 || 3 || 18.1 || .431 || .391 || .793 || 4.5 || 1.0 || .7 || .5 || 7.6
|- class="sortbottom"
| style="text-align:center;" colspan="2"|Career
| 95 || 14 || 17.8 || .417 || .366 || .766 || 4.3 || 1.0 || .6 || .5 || 6.8

College

|-
| style="text-align:left;"|2017–18
| style="text-align:left;"|Villanova
| 40 || 39 || 28.1 || .476 || .433 || .700 || 8.0 || .8 || .7 || 1.5 || 10.9

References

External links

 Villanova Wildcats bio
 ESPN profile

1997 births
Living people
African-American basketball players
American men's basketball players
Atlanta Hawks draft picks
Atlanta Hawks players
Basketball players from Cleveland
Erie BayHawks (2017–2019) players
Erie BayHawks (2019–2021) players
Golden State Warriors players
Iowa Wolves players
Power forwards (basketball)
Villanova Wildcats men's basketball players
21st-century African-American sportspeople
Anyang KGC players
American expatriate basketball people in South Korea